A list of rivers of Bavaria, Germany:

A
Aalbach
Abens
Ach
Afferbach
Affinger Bach
Ailsbach
Aisch
Aiterach
Alpbach
Alster
Altmühl
Alz
Amper
Anlauter
Arbach
Arbachgraben
Aschaff
Aschbach
Attel
Aubach, tributary of the Elsava
Aubach, tributary of the Lohr
Aubach, tributary of the Schwabach
Auer Mühlbach
Auerbach
Aufseß
Aura
Aurach, tributary of the Rednitz
Aurach, tributary of the Regnitz in Middle Franconia
Aurach, tributary of the Regnitz in Upper Franconia
Autenbach

B
Bachhaupter Laber
Bächlesbach
Bachmühlbach
Bachquellengraben
Bachwiesengraben
Banzerbach
Baunach
Bayerbacher Bach
Beibuschbach
Berchtesgadener Ache
Bessenbach
Betzenbach
Biber
Biberbach
Bibert
Bina
Blankenbach
Bolgenach
Bösbach
Brandenberger Ache
Braunau
Breitach
Breitbach
Breitenbach
Breitenbrunner Bach
Breitenbrunner Laber
Brend
Brenz
Brombach
Bruchbach
Bruckbach
Brunnbach
Brunnenbach
Brunnthaler Quellbach
Bubesheimer Bach
Büchelbach
Buxach
Buxbach

C
Chamb
Creußen

D
Dammbach
Danube
Deichselbach
Dober
Döbrabach (also called Döbra)
Dobrach
Dorfen
Dörnsenbach
Dühlbach
Dürnbach
Dürrschweinnaab

E
Ebrach, tributary of the Attel
Ebrach, tributary of the Reiche Ebrach
Ecknach
Edelbach
Effelder
Egau
Eger
Ehenbach
Eichbach
Eichelbach
Eichenberger Bach
Eichenwaldgraben
Eilenbach
Einfallsgraben
Eisbach
Ellbach
Els
Elsava
Engelbach
Ens
Entenbach
Erf
Erlau
Erlbach
Erlenbach, tributary of the Kahl
Erlenbach, tributary of the Laufach
Erlenbach, tributary of the Main
Erlenbach, tributary of the Mindel
Eschach
Eßmühler Bach
Eyach

F
Fahrbach
Falkenbach
Falkenseebach
Farrnbach
Faulbach
Feisnitz
Felchbach
Feldkahl
Fellach
Festenbach
Fichtelnaab
Fichtenohe
Fischbach, tributary of the Linder
Fischbach, tributary of the Goldbach which discharges into the Pegnitz
Fischbach, tributary of the Weiße Traun
Fleutersbach
Flinzbach
Floß
Flossach
Folzbach
Forchbach
Forellenbach, tributary of the Eger
Forellenbach, tributary of the Vils
Forstgraben
Franconian Rezat
Franconian Saale
Friedberger Ach
Friesenbach
Frommbach
Füllbach

G
Gailach
Gaißa
Gallersbach
Gauchsbach
Geiselbach
Geislbach
Geißler
Gennach
Gersprenz
Gießgraben, tributary of the Schutter
Gießgraben,  tributary of the Zusam
Gießenbach
Girnitz
Gitzenbach
Glasbach
Glattbach
Gleiritsch
Glonn, tributary of the Amper
Glonn, tributary of the Mangfall
Glött
Goldbach, tributary of the Aschaff
Goldbach, tributary of the Kahl
Goldbach, tributary of the Mangfall
Goldbach, tributary of the Pegnitz
Gollach
Gosenbach
Götzinger Achen
Grabenbach
Grambach
Gregnitz
Gröbenbach
Großache (alternative name of the Tiroler Achen)
Große Laber
Große Ohe
Große Vils
Große Isar, a branch of the Isar in Munich
Große Isar, a branch of the Isar in Landshut
Großer Koserbach, upper course of the Koserbach
Großwaldbach
Grümpel
Grundgraben
Gründlach
Gründleinsbach
Güntersbach
Günz
Gunzenbach
Gunzesrieder Ach
Gutenbach
Gutnach

H
Habersbach
Hachinger Bach
Häckergrundbach
Hafenlohr
Haggraben
Haidenaab
Hainerbach
Halbammer
Halblech
Halsbach
Hammerbach
Harlachinger Quellbach
Hartlaber
Hasel
Haselbach, tributary of the Günz
Haselbach, tributary of the Kammel
Haslochbach
Hasslach
Hemsbach
Hengersberger Ohe
Hensbach
Herzbach
Heubach
Hinterer Troppelgraben
Hitziger Lochgraben
Högenbach
Hohlbach
Hohlenbach
Höllbach
Höllenbach
Holzgraben
Hombach
Hösbach
Huckelheimer Bach
Hungerbach, tributary of the Altmühl
Hungerbach, tributary of the Gennach
Hüttenbach

I
Igelsbach
Iglseebach
Illach
Ilm
Ilz
Irschinger Ach
Isen
Issig
Ittlinger Bach
Itz
Iller
Inn
Isar

J
Jachen

K
Kahl
Kainach
Kalkach
Kalte Moldau
Kaltenbach, headstream of the Elsava
Kaltenbach, tributary of the Mangfall
Kaltenmühlbach
Kalterbach
Kammel
Karbach
Katzbach
Kellbach
Kertelbach
Kessel
Kieferbach
Kinsach
Kirchengrundbach
Kirnach
Klafferbach
Klausbach
Kleinaschaff
Kleine Ammer
Kleine Donau
Kleine Isar, a branch of the Isar in Munich
Kleine Isar, a branch of the Isar in Landshut
Kleine Kahl
Kleine Laber
Kleine Ohe, tributary of the Danube
Kleine Ohe, headwater of the Ilz
Kleine Paar
Kleine Sinn
Kleine Vils
Kleine Weisach
Kleiner Koserbach
Kleinlaudenbach
Klingenbach
Klosterbach
Klosterbeurener Bach
Kohlbach
Kollbach
Königsseer Ache
Konstanzer Ach
Köschinger Bach
Koser, alternative name of the Koserbach
Koserbach
Kötz
Krähenbach
Krebsbach, tributary of the Itz
Krebsbach, tributary of the Kahl
Krebsbach, tributary of the Paar
Krebsbach, tributary of the Rodach
Krebsbach, tributary of the Steinach
Krebsbach, tributary of the Günz
Kremnitz, headwater of the Kronach
Krombach
Kronach, tributary of the Haßlach
Kronach, tributary of the White Main
Krumbach
Krumbächlein
Kühruhgraben
Kupferbach
Kürnach

L
Lamitz
Langbach
Langwieder Bach
Lanzenbach
Lappach
Laubersbach
Lauer
Laufach
Laugna
Lausenbach, tributary of the Ohře (Eger)
Lauter tributary of the Baunach
Lauter tributary of the Itz
Lauterach
Lech
Leckner Ach
Leibi
Leiblach
Leinleiter
Leitenbach
Leitzach
Leuchsenbach
Lillach
Lindenbach
Linder
Litzelbach
Lohmgraben
Lohr
Lohrbach
Loisach
Loquitz
Luhe
Lüßbach

M
Mailinger Bach
Main
Maisach
Maisinger Bach
Mangfall
Maria-Einsiedel-Bach
Maria-Einsiedel-Mühlbach
Maß
Matzbach
Mauerner Bach
Memminger Ach
Menach
Michelbach
Mies
Milz
Mindel
Mistel
Mittelbühlgraben
Mitternacher Ohe
Mittlere Ebrach
Moosach
Moosbach
Motschenbach
Muglbach
Mühlbach, tributary of the Altmühl
Mühlbach, tributary of the Gleiritsch
Mümling
Münsterer Alte
Murach
Mutterbach

N
Naab
Naifer Bach
Nassach
Näßlichbach
Nau
Neualmbach
Neufnach
Neuwiesenbach
Nonnenbach, tributary to the Aschaff
Nonnenbach, tributary of Lake Constance
Northern Regnitz

O
Obere Argen
Oberer Wehrbach
Oberschurbach
Oberstjägermeisterbach
Ohlenbach
Ohře
Ölschnitz, headstream of the Red Main
Ölschnitz, headstream of the White Main
Omersbach
Osterbach
Östliche Günz
Ostrach
Otterbach, tributary of the Danube
Otterbach, tributary of the Klosterbeurener Bach
Ottmarsfelder Graben
Oybach

P
Paar
Partnach
Pegnitz
Perlenbach
Pfatter
Pfettrach
Pfreimd
Pleichach
Premich
Prien
Proviantbach
Pulverbach
Püttlach

Q
Querbach
Quirinbach

R
Ramsauer Ache
Ranna
Rannach
Ransbach
Rappach
Rauhe Ebrach
Red Main
Rednitz
Regen
Regnitz
Reiche Ebrach
Reichenbach
Reitbach
Rengersbrunner Bach
Reschbach
Rieder Bach, tributary of the Mindel
Rieder Bach, tributary of the Rinchnach
Rinchnach
Rinchnacher Ohe
Ringelbach
Rißbach
Rodach, tributary of the Itz
Rodach, tributary of the Main
Röderbach, tributary of the Aschaff
Rohrach, tributary of the Iller
Rohrach, tributary of the Wörnitz
Rohrbach, tributary of the Felchbach
Rohrbach, tributary of the Tauber
Rohrgraben
Röllbach
Rosenbach
Röslau
Rote Traun
Roter Graben
Roth, tributary of the Danube
Roth, tributary of the Rednitz
Roth, tributary of the Zusam
Röthbach
Röthelbach, tributary of the Saalach
Röthelbach, tributary of the Traun
Röthen
Rott, tributary of the Ammersee
Rott, a tributary of the Inn near Neuhaus am Inn, opposite of Schärding
Rott, a tributary of the Inn at Rott am Inn
Rottach, right tributary of the Iller at the boundary between the municipalities Sulzberg and Rettenberg
Rottach, left tributary of the Iller at Kempten
Rottach, tributary of the Tegernsee
Rückersbach
Ruhgraben

S
Saalach
Saale
Sagwasser
Sailaufbach
Salzach
Sälzerbach
Salzersgraben
Sandrach
Sauerbach
Saußbach
Schambach
Schandtauber
Schießbach
Schlangenbach, tributary of the Altmühl
Schlangenbach, tributary of the Regnitz
Schlierach
Schlossauer Ohe
Schloßgrundgraben
Schmerbach
Schmerlenbach
Schmutter
Schnaittach
Schneppenbach
Schönach
Schondra
Schorgast
Schutter
Schwabach, tributary of the Rednitz
Schwabach, tributary of the Regnitz
Schwabinger Bach
Schwabinger Eisbach
Schwarzach, tributary of the Altmühl
Schwarzach, tributary of the Main
Schwarzach, tributary of the Naab
Schwarzach, tributary of the Rednitz
Schwarzbach, tributary of the Günz
Schwarzbach, tributary of the Laufach
Schwarzbach, tributary of the Reschbach
Schwarzbach, tributary of the Saalach
Schwarze Laber
Schwarzenbach, tributary of the Obere Argen
Schwarzenbach, tributary of the Weißach
Schwarzlofer
Schwebelbach
Schweinnaab
Schwesnitz
Schörgenbach
Schützbach
Seebach, tributary of the Isar
Seebach, headwater of the Laufach
Seebach, tributary of the Rhine–Main–Danube Canal
Seetraun
Seibertsbach
Selbbach
Selbitz
Sempt
Siebenbrunner Bächl
Siechenbach
Silberbach
Sims
Sindersbach
Singold
Sinn
Sittenbach
Söllbach
Sommerkahl
Speckkahl
Starzlach, tributary of the Breitach
Starzlach, tributary of the Ostrach
Starzlach, tributary of the Wertach
Steinach
Steinbach, tributary of the Hafenlohr
Steinbach, tributary of the Kahl
Steinbach, tributary of the Main
Steinbach, tributary of the Paar
Steinbach, tributary of the Reichenbach
Steinbach, tributary of the Saalach
Sterzenbach
Stickelgraben
Stillach
Stoißer Ache
Störzelbach
Streitmühlbach
Streu, tributary of the Franconian Saale
Streu, tributary of the Kahl
Strogen
Southern Regnitz
Sulz
Sulzach
Sulzbach, tributary of the Main
Sulzbach, tributary of the Rott
Sur
Swabian Rezat

T
Tannbach
Tauber
Teisnach
Teuschnitz
Thierbach
Thosbach
Thulba
Thüringische Muschwitz
Tiergartenbach
Tiroler Achen
Töpener Bach or Töpenbach – alternative name of the Kupferbach
Traun
Trebgast
Treppengraben
Trettach
Trubach
Truppach

U
Umlaufgraben
Unkenbach
Untere Argen
Untere Steinach
Unterer Hösbach
Unterer Wehrbach
Ussel

V
Vils, tributary of the Danube
Vils, tributary of the Lech
Vils, tributary of the Naab
Volkach
Vorbach
Vorderer Troppelgraben

W
Wachsteiner Bach
Waizenbach
Waldnaab
Walkershöfer Weihergraben
Walkerszeller Bach
Wannig
Wappach
Warme Steinach
Wehmig
Weibersbach, tributary of the Kahl in Michelbach, a district of Alzenau
Weibersbach, tributary of the Kahl in Schimborn, a district of Mömbris
Weihergraben, tributary of the Altmühl
Weihergraben, tributary of the Zipser Mühlbach
Weilach
Weiler Ach
Weimersheimer Bach
Weismain
Weißach, in the German and Austrian Alps, tributary of the Bregenzer Ach
Weißach, tributary of the Tegernsee
Weißbach, tributary of the Saalach, its source at the Dreisesselberg, Lattengebirge
Weißbach, tributary of the Saalach, in the areas of the municipalities Inzell and Schneizlreuth
Weiße Laber
Weizenbach
Weiße Traun
Wellenbach
Welzbach, tributary of the Main
Welzbach, tributary of the Tauber
Wern
Wertach
Westerbach, tributary of the Hasel
Westerbach, tributary of the Kahl
Westernach
Westliche Günz
White Main
Wiesau
Wiesbach, tributary of the Lech
Wiesbach, tributary of the Rott that is a tributary of the Inn near Neuhaus am Inn
Wiesbüttgraben
Wiesent, tributary of the Danube
Wiesent, tributary of the Regnitz
Wieseth
Wilde Rodach
Windach
Winterswiesbach
Winzenhohler Bach
Wissinger Laber
Wohnroder Bach
Wolfach
Wolfsbach
Wolfsteiner Ohe
Wondreb
Wörnitz
Wörthbach
Würm

Z
Zandtbach
Zeegenbach
Zeiselbach
Zeitlbach
Zeller Bach, tributary of the Isar
Zeller Bach, tributary of the Kressenbach, the upper course of the Memminger Ach
Zenn
Zentbach
Zeubach
Zipser Mühlbach
Zottelbach
Zusam

 
Bav 
Riv